Once Upon a Time in Seoul (lit. Boys Don't Cry) is a 2008 South Korean drama film starring Lee Wan and Song Chang-eui.

Plot
1953, the Korean war has ended, but the fight for survival has just begun. Two 18-year-old boys, Tae-ho and Jong-du, live in a camp for orphaned boys, which is more of a concentration camp where everyone suffers from hunger, inhumane treatment and unbearable work conditions. But these two have a dream of a better tomorrow. Tae-ho is the one with wits and brains and Jong-du is the tough street fighter. Together they scheme to steal US Army supplies and recruit other boys to grow their business. But when they start to take business away from the local gangsters, their fight for survival turns into a war.

Cast
Lee Wan as Jong-du
Song Chang-eui as Tae-ho 
Greena Park as Soon-nam 
Lee Ki-young as Do-cheol 
Ahn Gil-kang as Myeong-soo 
Jung Kyung-ho as Mouse 
Park Yeong-seo as Deok-bae 
Kang Yi-seok as Wonder child 
Cha Seung-yeol as Jae-gook 
Han Seong-jin as Sang-gook 
Joo Min-soo as Yeong-nam 
Eom Min-hyeok as Woo-sik 
Im Yeong-sik as Sang-il 
Lee Geon-moon as Yong-goo 
Kim Geon-ho as Mr. Jang 
Song Young-chang as Man-gi (cameo)

References

External links 
  
 
 
 

2008 films
2000s Korean-language films
South Korean drama films
2000s South Korean films
Myung Films films